BLUF (Breeches and Leather Uniform Fanclub) is an international fraternal organization of gay men and MSM sharing a fetishistic interest in leather breeches and uniforms. The leather breeches are worn inside tall leather boots known as jackboots. BLUF is a part of a larger leather subculture and the sexual aesthetic is similar to the exaggerated masculinity seen in the work of Tom of Finland. Members share interest in leather fetishism, boot fetishism, and uniform fetishism. Some wear leather uniforms reminiscent of German World War II era uniforms, but without the Nazi regalia or embracing of NSDAP politics.  The other common uniforms worn are those of American style police motorcycle patrol and German police.

Dress code and guidelines 
Membership is open to men of all races and nationalities above the age of consent in members' home countries. In order to join the club, the applicants are required to respect a strict dress code and a set of guidelines explained on the club's official website: BLUF Dresscode. Any breach of the requirements listed will result in a rejection of the photo and therefore of the application. Once the application is accepted, the member is assigned a random number that identifies him among the other members.

History 
BLUF began as an Internet site in 1997 from Montreal, Canada but has evolved to a series of in-person meets and events regularly scheduled in European and North American cities. Members frequently plan vacation time around, and travel to, international meetings. A majority of members live in northern Europe, primarily Belgium, Denmark, Finland, France, Germany, Ireland, the Netherlands, the United Kingdom and Sweden, but members are found in North America, Asia, Central America, South America and Africa.

BLUF started in October 1997 as a simple HTML-based website for men into full leather uniforms. According to the founder, I was living in Montreal then and I had just discovered the joys of Internet. I joined Leather Navigator, which at that time was the only internet platform for leather men. Being disappointed with the absence of any kind of dress code, I started BLUF. I contacted a few friends by email, sent postcards to others (not everybody had a computer in those days), and informed them about the new club. Some of them joined. At the beginning, almost all new members were American. I had met quite a few at parties in Canada and the U.S. Not many Europeans had internet access then. The site consisted in those days of a picture gallery, a list of members, a list of admirers (for those that couldn't meet the dress code requirements), an online magazine and (a little later) a forum. Access was free. The cost of the server was covered by me. I was the webmaster and maintained the site. 

In September 1998, the first BLUF party was held during Folsom Weekend at the Loading Dock in San Francisco. Although we only had about 150 members then, the party became a huge success and is still remembered as one of the best in BLUF history. Around November 1998, the first in a series of BLUF parties was held in London. Many guys from the UK joined as a result.

In 1999 I moved back to Amsterdam, and in autumn, closed down the site because of financial problems. Some of the members got together and convinced me to re-open the site and give members the opportunity to donate money to keep the site running. Around the same time, I restricted access to the BLUF public picture galleries through an age verification system (AdultCheck, now ManCheck). This brought in enough money to pay the bills and for a while even provided some pocket money. More Europeans joined the club. Slowly, the emphasis shifted from North America to Europe.

In 2008, BLUF received the Large Club of the Year award as part of the Pantheon of Leather Awards.

BLUF 3 went online in December 2009, with the ability to send messages between members and upload photos directly.

In 2012, during the 15th anniversary year. the organization reached 3,000 members. On Sunday, 20 January 2013, during Belgium's Leather Pride, BLUF won the X Award for Fetish Organisation 2013.

References

 Hooven, F, Valentine. Tom of Finland, His Life and Times. St. Martin's Griffin, Stonewall Inn Editions: 1994. .
 Ramakers, Micha. Tom of Finland: The Art of Pleasure. Taschen: 2002. .

External links
The BLUF website

BDSM organizations
Gay male BDSM
International LGBT organizations
Fetish subculture
Fetish clothing
Leather subculture
Uniforms